Sebastião Barradas was a Portuguese exegete and preacher.

Born at Lisbon in 1543; died at Coimbra in 1615. In 1558 he entered the Society of Jesus. He was professor of scripture for many years at Coimbra and Évora and was styled the Apostle of Portugal for the zeal of his preaching. He published two works: 

 Commentaria in concordiam et historiam evangelicam (4 vols., Coimbra, 1599-1611). This work, intended for preachers on the Gospels, was frequently reprinted in Germany, Italy, and France. The last edition was printed at Sugsburg, 1642. 
 Itinererarium filiorum Israel ex Aegypto in terram repromissis (Lyons, 1620). It is a useful commentary on the Book of Exodus.

References

17th-century Portuguese Jesuits
1543 births
1615 deaths
Clergy from Lisbon
16th-century Portuguese Jesuits